The Xinjiang Economic Daily is a state-run daily newspaper published in the Xinjiang autonomous region of the People's Republic of China. It is published in the Chinese language only. It is considered to be one of the most dynamic newspapers in China.

The department responsible for the Xinjiang Economic Daily also publish newspapers aimed at overseas Chinese in Kyrgyzstan (since 2006) and in Kazakhstan (since 2009).

References

Daily newspapers published in China
Chinese-language newspapers (Simplified Chinese)
Mass media in Xinjiang